The 2013 Glynhill Ladies International was held from January 18 to 20 at the Braehead Curling Rink in Glasgow, Scotland as part of the 2012–13 World Curling Tour. The event was held in a round robin format, and the purse for the event was GBP£8,000, of which the winner, Binia Feltscher, received GBP£2,500. Feltscher defeated Heather Nedohin of Canada in the final with a score of 8–1.

Teams
The teams are listed as follows:

Round robin standings
Final Round Robin Standings

Playoffs

References

External links
GLI Home Page

Glynhill Ladies International
Glynhill Ladies International
Glynhill Ladies International
Women's curling competitions in Scotland
International sports competitions in Glasgow